Château de Birkenwald is a château in Birkenwald, in the department of Bas-Rhin, France. Construction began in 1562 in the Renaissance style. It became a listed monument historique on 16 October 1930.

References

Châteaux in Bas-Rhin
Monuments historiques of Bas-Rhin